Sound Unity is a live album by American jazz double bassist William Parker, which was recorded in 2004 and originally released on the AUM Fidelity label.

Reception

In his review for AllMusic, Thom Jurek states "Sound Unity is the most beautifully wrought of William Parker's ensemble recordings ... This is a stellar offering from one of the music's greatest lights." The Penguin Guide to Jazz observed ""Hawaii" and the title track are both exceptional lines dealt with at length and "Poem for June Jordan" , dedicated to the black feminist writer, is an intense statement".

The All About Jazz review noted "Each tune in this generous (70-minute) set has its own dedication and story, elaborated in the liner notes along with a few other words from the composer. Each is sufficiently different that you'll run into plenty of surprises along the way. But once you've heard the record out, what's most striking is its overall connectedness". The JazzTimes review by Nate Chinen commented "The new disc, recorded live in Canada during a summer tour last year, advances Parker's claim to a post-bop experimentalism that swings"

Track listing
All compositions by William Parker
 "Hawaii" - 12:32
 "Wood Flute Song" - 10:43
 "Poem for June Jordan"	- 8:53
 " Sound Unity" - 21:02
 "Harlem" - 8:48
 " Groove" - 8:19
Tracks 1, 2, 5, 6 recorded at Vancouver East Cultural Centre on Friday, July 2, 2004 . [Vancouver International Festival] 
Tracks 3, 4 recorded at La Sala Rossa on Sunday, June 27, 2004. [Suoni Per Il Popolo (Montreal)]

Personnel
William Parker - bass
Lewis Barnes - trumpet
Rob Brown - alto saxophone
Hamid Drake - drums

References

2005 live albums
AUM Fidelity live albums
William Parker (musician) live albums